Shehnad Jalal born 28 June 1978, is a cinematographer based in Kerala, India. After completing his Post Graduation in Commerce from the Kerala University, in 2002, he joined the Satyajit Ray Film and Television Institute (SRFTI), Kolkata for Post Graduate Diploma in Cinematography. After graduating in 2006, he started his career as an assistant to the renowned Cinematographer Venu and went on to work with him in several feature films, documentaries and television commercials. Shehnad Jalal made his debut as a Cinematographer in the film Chitrasutram, directed by Vipin Vijay. The film won him the Kerala State Film Award for Best Cinematography in the year 2010. The documentary, A Pestering Journey directed by K R Manoj won him the Navaroze Contractor Award for the Best Documentary Cameraman at the 4th International Documentary and Short Film Festival of Kerala, 2011., He won a nomination for Achievement in Cinematography at the Asia Pacific Screen Awards 2017, for his work in the movie Loktak Lairembee (Lady of the Lake) in the Meitei language, directed by Haobam Paban Kumar. The film had its world premiere at the Busan International Film Festival 2016 in the New Currents and was selected for the Berlinale FORUM 2017. The film won the Golden Gateway award for Best Film at the Mumbai International Film Festival 2016 and the National Award for the Best Indian Film on Environment Conservation, 2016.

Education 
 2002–2005 Post Graduate Diploma in Cinematography from Satyajit Ray Film and Television Institute, Kolkata, India.
 1996–1999: Graduate Degree in Commerce, University of Kerala, India.

Filmography

Feature films

Documentaries

Short films

Music video

External links 
http://www.imdb.com/name/nm4789171/
https://variety.com/2017/film/reviews/lady-of-the-lake-review-1201992238/
https://www.hollywoodreporter.com/review/lady-lake-review-937170

References 

1978 births
Living people
Artists from Thiruvananthapuram
Malayalam film cinematographers
Satyajit Ray Film and Television Institute alumni
Cinematographers from Kerala
21st-century Indian photographers